The British Columbia Civil Liberties Association has been involved in the following legal cases, either as an intervenor, applicant, or plaintiff. For the year ending December 31, 2016, the association had 30 active court cases and interventions that relied on the assistance of 49 pro bono counsel.

Supreme Court of Canada
A.B. v.  Bragg Communications Inc., 2012 SCC 46
Agraira v. Canada (Public  Safety and Emergency Preparedness), 2013 SCC 36
Alberta (Information and Privacy Commissioner) v. United Food and Commercial Workers, Local 401, 2013 SCC 62 
Babcock v. Canada (Attorney General), 2002 SCC 57
BC Freedom of Information and  Privacy Association v. Attorney General of British Columbia, 2017 SCC 6
Canada (Attorney General) v. Bedford, 2013 SCC 72
Canada (Attorney General) v.  Downtown Eastside Sex Workers United Against Violence Society, 2012 SCC 45
Canada (Attorney General) v.  PHS Community Services Society, 2011 SCC 44
Canada (Attorney General) v.  Whaling, 2014 SCC 20
Canada (Justice) v. Khadr, 2008 SCC 28    
Canadian Broadcasting Corp. v. Canada (Attorney General), 2011 SCC 2   
Canadian Broadcasting Corp. v. The Queen, 2011 SCC 3    
Carter v. Canada (Attorney General), 2015 SCC 5    
Chamberlain v. Surrey School  District No. 36, 2002 SCC 86    
Chatterjee v. Ontario (Attorney General), 2009 SCC 19    
Crookes v. Newton, 2011 SCC 47    
Divito v. Canada (Public  Safety and Emergency Preparedness), 2013 SCC 47    
Editions Ecosociete Inc. v.  Banro Corp., 2012 SCC 18    
Ernst v. Alberta Energy Regulator, 2017 SCC 1    
Ewert v. Canada, 2018 SCC 30
Frank v. Canada (Attorney General), 2019 SCC 1
Goodwin v. British Columbia  (Superintendent of Motor Vehicles), 2015 SCC 46    
Google Inc. v. Equustek Solutions Inc., et al., 2017 SCC 34  
Groia v. Law Society of Upper Canada, 2018 SCC 27  
Highwood Congregation of Jehovah’s Witnesses (Judicial Committee) v. Wall, 2018 SCC 26
Little Sisters Book and Art Emporium v. Canada (Minister of Justice), 2000 SCC 69    
M.M. v.  United States of America, 2015 SCC 62    
May v. Ferndale Institution, 2005 SCC 82    
Mission Institution v. Khela, 2014 SCC 24    
Mounted Police Association of  Ontario v. Canada (Attorney General), 2015 SCC 1    
Ontario (Public Safety and  Security) v. Criminal Lawyers' Association, 2010 SCC 23    
Penner v. Niagara (Regional  Police Services Board), 2013 SCC 1 9    
R. v. Anthony-Cook, 2016 SCC 43    
R. v. Appulonappa, 2015 SCC 59    
R. v. Boudreault, 2018 SCC 58
R. v. Bradshaw, 2017 SCC 35    
R. v. Butler, [1992] 1 S.C.R.  452    
R. v. Carvery, 2014 SCC 27    
R. v. Chehil, 2013 SCC 49    
R. v. Clay, 2003 SCC 75    
R. v. Cornell, 2010 SCC 31    
R. v. Criminal Lawyers'  Association of Ontario, 2013 SCC 43    
R. v. Cuerrier, [1998] 2  S.C.R. 371    
R. v. D.C., 2012 SCC 48    
R. v. Davey, 2012 SCC 75   
R. v. Emms, 2012 SCC 74    
R. v. Fearon, 2014 SCC 77    
R. v. Hart, 2014 SCC 52    
R. v. Ipeelee, 2012 SCC 13    
R. v. J.F., 2013 SCC 12    
R. v. Jones, 2017 SCC 60
R. v. Jordan, 2016 SCC 27   
R. v. K.R.J., 2016 SCC 31    
R. v. Khawaja, 2012 SCC 69    
R. v. Lloyd, 2016 SCC 13    
R. v. Mabior, 2012 SCC 47
R. v. Marakah, 2017 SCC 59
R. v. MacKenzie, 2013 SCC 50    
R. v. Malmo-Levine; R. v.  Caine, 2003 SCC 74    
R. v. Manning, 2013 SCC 1    
R. v. McCrimmon, 2010 SCC 36    
R. v. National Post, 2010 SCC  16    
R. v. Nur, 2015 SCC 15    
R. v. O.N.E., 2001 SCC 77    
R. v.  Paterson, 2017 SCC 15    
R. v. Pham, 2013 SCC 15    
R. v. Safarzadeh-Markhali, 2016 SCC 14    
R. v. Sharpe, 2001 SCC 2    
R. v. Sinclair, 2010 SCC 35    
R. v. Smith, 2015 SCC 34    
R. v. Tse, 2012 SCC 16    
R. v. Vice Media Canada Inc., 2018 SCC 53
R. v. Vu, 2013 SCC 60    
R. v.  Williamson, 2016 SCC 28    
R. v. Willier, 2010 SCC 37    
R. v. Yumnu, 2012 SCC 73    
Reference re Prov. Electoral Boundaries (Sask.), [1991] 2  S.C.R. 158    
Reference re Same-Sex Marriage, 2004 SCC 79    
Saskatchewan Federation of Labour v. Saskatchewan, 2015 SCC 4    
Sauve v. Canada (Chief Electoral Officer), 2002 SCC 68    
Sriskandarajah v. United  States of America, 2012 SCC 70    
Tran v. Canada (Public Safety and Emergency Preparedness), 2017 SCC 50   
Trinity Western University v. British Columbia College of Teachers, 2001 SSC 31    
WIC Radio Ltd. v. Simpson,  2008 SCC 40    
Wood v. Schaeffer, 2013 SCC 71    
World Bank Group v. Wallace, 2016 SCC 15

British Columbia Court of Appeal
British Columbia Civil Liberties Association v. Canada (Attorney General), 2018 BCCA 282
British Columbia Civil Liberties Association v. Canada (Attorney General), 2019 BCCA 5
R. v. Small, [1973] 4 W.W.R. 563
Hoogbruin v. Attorney General of British Columbia, [1986] 2 W.W.R. 700
Lamb v. Canada (Attorney General), 2018 BCCA 266
Shewchuk v. Ricard, [1986] 28 D.L.R. (4th) 429
Kempling v. The British Columbia College of Teachers, [2005] BCCA 327
Vancouver Aquarium Marine Science Centre v. Charbonneau, 2017 BCCA 395

Supreme Court of British Columbia
Dybikowski v. Attorney General of British Columbia, [1979] 2 W.W.R. 631
British Columbia Civil Liberties Association v. Attorney General of British Columbia, [1988] 4 W.W.R. 100
Dixon v. Attorney General of British Columbia, [1989] 3 BCLR (2d) 231
Russow and Lambert v. Attorney General of British Columbia, [1989] 4 W.W.R. 186
Austin v. Personnel Services Branch, Ministry of Municipal Affairs, Recreation and Culture et al., [1990] 66 D.L.R. (4th) 33
Dr. Dutton v. British Columbia Human Rights Tribunal et al., 2001 BCSC 1256
City of Vancouver v. Maurice et al., 2002 BCSC 1421
Canadian Federation of Students - British Columbia Component et al. v. Greater Vancouver Transportation Authority et al., 2006 BCSC 455
Barker v. Hayes, 2006 BCSC 1217
Canada (AG) v PHS Community Services Society, 2008 BCSC 661
Victoria (City) v. Adams, 2008 BCSC 1363
Arkinstall v. City of Surrey, 2008 BCSC 1419
British Columbia Civil Liberties Association v. Canada (Attorney General), 2018 BCSC 62

British Columbia Provincial Court 
 R. v. British Columbia Civil Liberties Association, 2012 BCPC 406

British Columbia Human Rights Tribunal
Canadian Jewish Congress v. Doug Collins and the North Shore News, [1997] 23
Elmasry v. Roger's Publishing, 2008 BCHRT 378

Federal Court of Appeal 
 Amnesty International Canada v. Canada (Canadian Forces), 2008 FCA 401
 Schmidt v. Canada (Attorney General), 2018 FCA 55

Federal Court of Canada
Amnesty International Canada v. Canadian Forces, 2007 FC 1147
British Columbia Civil Liberties Association v. Canada (Attorney General), 2007 FC 901
British Columbia Civil Liberties Association v. Canada (Attorney General), 2018 FC 1094
British Columbia Civil Liberties Association v. Canada (Citizenship and Immigration), 2016 FC 1223
British Columbia Civil Liberties Association v. Royal Canadian Mounted Police, 2008 FC 49 
Canada (Attorney General) v. Amnesty International Canada, 2009 FC 426
Canada (Attorney General) v. Amnesty International Canada, 2009 FC 918
Canada (Human Rights Commission) v. Warman, 2012 FC 1162
Garrick v. Amnesty International Canada, 2011 FC 1099

Alberta Court of Appeal 
 UAlberta Pro-Life v. Governors of the University of Alberta, 2018 ABCA 350

Ontario Court of Appeal 
 R. v. Mernagh, 2013 ONCA 67
 R. v. Vice Media Canada Inc., 2017 ONCA 231

Saskatchewan Court of Queen's Bench 
Strom v. Saskatchewan Registered Nurses’ Association, 2017 SKQB 110
Strom v. Saskatchewan Registered Nurses’ Association, 2017 SKQB 355

References

British Columbia case law
Case law lists by party or amicus